Onagrodes oosyndica is a moth in the family Geometridae. It is found on Peninsular Malaysia, Sumatra, Borneo and Sulawesi.

References

Moths described in 1958
Eupitheciini